This is a partial list of the local underground newspapers launched during the Sixties era of the hippie/psychedelic/youth/counterculture/New Left/antiwar movements, approximately 1965–1973. This list includes periodically appearing papers of general countercultural interest printed in a newspaper format, and specific to a particular locale.

Australia 

 Sydney FTA, Sydney, 1970

Belgium
Amenophis, Brussels, 1965–1975
Real Free Press, Antwerp

Canada

Alberta
Canada Goose, Edmonton

British Columbia
The Georgia Straight, Vancouver

Manitoba
The Lovin' Couch Press, Winnipeg
Ǒmṕhalǒs, Winnipeg

Ontario
Harbinger, Toronto
Octopus, Ottawa (later Ottawa's Free Press)

Quebec
Pop-See-Cul, Montreal, 1967–1968

France
Actuel, Paris
Interluttes, Paris

India
Hungry Generation weekly bulletins, Calcutta (1961–1965)
Krittibas

Italy
Fuori!
Re Nudo
Tampax

United Kingdom
Black Dwarf
Brighton Voice
Friends (later Frendz)
Gandalf's Garden
Ink
International Times (also IT)
Oz

United States

Alabama 

 Exponent, University of Alabama in Huntsville, 1969–present
High gauge, Tuscaloosa
Rearguard, Mobile, 1971

Arizona
Bandersnatch, Tempe, 1968–1969
Butterfield Express, Tucson
Druid Free Press, Tempe, 1969
Gambit, Tempe, 1968
Rebirth, Phoenix, 1969
Resurrection, Tucson, 1970

California
Alto, Isla Vista, 1967–1969
Berkeley Barb, Berkeley, 1965–1980
Berkeley Tribe, Berkeley, 1969–1972 (split from the Berkeley Barb after staff went on strike)
The Black Panther, Oakland
Bullsheet, Pasadena, California, 1969–1974
Dock of the Bay, San Francisco
Free Spaghetti Dinner, Santa Cruz
 From Out of Sherwood Forest, Newport Beach, California
Good Times, San Francisco, 1969–1972 (formerly San Francisco Express-Times)
Haight Ashbury Free Press, San Francisco
Haight Ashbury Tribune, San Francisco (at least 16 issues)
Illustrated Paper, Mendocino, 1966–1967
Leviathan, San Francisco, 1969–1970 
Long Beach Free Press, Long Beach, 1969–1970
Los Angeles Free Press, Los Angeles, 1964–1978 (new series 2005–present)
Los Angeles Staff, Los Angeles (splintered from Los Angeles Free Press)
Northcoast Ripsaw, Eureka
OB Rag, Ocean Beach, 1970–1975 (new series 2001–2003, blog 2007–present)
Open City, Los Angeles, 1967–1969
Oracle of Southern California, Los Angeles
The Organ, Fresno, 1968
The Organ, San Francisco, 1970–1971
Peninsula Observer, Palo Alto
The San Diego Door, San Diego, 1966–1970 (formerly Good Morning, Teaspoon)
San Diego Free Press, San Diego 1968–1970 (changed name to San Diego Street Journal)
San Francisco Express Times, San Francisco, 1968–1969 (changed name to Good Times)
San Francisco Oracle, San Francisco, 1966–1968
San Jose Maverick, San Jose
San Jose Red Eye, San Jose
Seventy-Nine Cent Spread, Carmel
Stockton Silver Hammer, Stockton
SunDance, San Francisco, 1972
Tuesday's Child, Los Angeles, 1969–1970

Colorado
Aboveground, Colorado Springs, 1969–1970
Blue Screw, Aurora, 1973–1974
Chinook, Denver, 1969–1972
El Gallo, Denver, 1967–1975
Mountain Free Press, Denver, 1968–1970

Connecticut
Hartford's Other Voice, Hartford
Storrs Weekly Reader, Storrs, 1971–1973
View from the Bottom, New Haven

Delaware
Heterodoxical Voice, Newark

District of Columbia
Colonial Times, 1971–1972
The Daily Rag, 1972
Quicksilver Times, 1969–1972
Washington Free Press

Florida
Amazing Grace, Tallahassee
Aquarian, Temple Terrace, 1969
Balaklava, Sarasota
Bay Area Free Press, Tampa, 1970
Both Sides Now, Jacksonville, 1969–1975
Daily Planet, Miami (formerly Miami Free Press)
Gulf Coast Fish Cheer, Pensacola
 Iconoclast, Pensacola, Florida, 1971–1974
The Monocle, Tampa
Ragweed, St. Petersburg

Georgia
Albion's Grace, Savannah
The Great Speckled Bird, Atlanta, 1968–1976

Illinois
The Angry Voice, Greenville, 1969–1970
 Big Muddy Gazette, Carbondale, 1969–1972
The Bridge, Chicago, 1967–1968
Chicago Seed, Chicago, 1967–1973
Chicago Kaleidoscope, Chicago
Curb: Dedicated to Curbing Armed Problem Solving and Solving People Problems, Elmhurst, Illinois, 1970–1973
A Four Year Bummer, Champaign, 1969–1970
News from Nowhere, DeKalb
Rising Up Angry, Chicago, 1969–1975
Second City, Chicago
The Walrus, University of Illinois, Champaign-Urbana, 1968–1973

Indiana
Bauls of the Brickyard, West Lafayette, 1969
Grinding Stone, Terre Haute
Indianapolis Free Press, Indianapolis, 1969–1970
The Only Alternative, Muncie, 1968–1971
The Spectator, Bloomington, 1966–1971

Iowa
Middle Earth, Iowa City, 1967–1968
Pterodactyl, Grinnell

Kansas
Alchemist, Manhattan, 1968–1969
Custer's Last Stand, Manhattan, 1971
Vortex, Lawrence

Kentucky
Blue-tail fly, Lexington
Callallo #20, Lexington
Free Press of Louisville, Louisville

Louisiana
 In Arcane Logos, New Orleans, 1969
NOLA Express, New Orleans
The Ungarbled Word, New Orleans

Maryland
Baltimore Free Press, Baltimore, 1968
Dragon Seed, Baltimore, 1972
Harry, Baltimore, 1969–1970
The Pawn, Fort Detrick, 1969–1970

Massachusetts

Avatar, Boston, 1967–1968
Boston Free Press, Boston
Boston Phoenix
The Free Press of Springfield, Springfield (became Common Sense in 1969)
Mother of Voices, Amherst
Old Mole, Cambridge
Thursday, Cambridge
Worcester Phoenix
Worcester Punch, Worcester
Zig zag, Montague

Michigan
Ann Arbor Argus, Ann Arbor, 1969–1971
 Ann Arbor Sun, Ann Arbor, Michigan, 1971–1976
Fifth Estate, Detroit, 1965–present
god mother and apple pie/Up Against the Wall Street Journal, Saginaw, 1969–1971
The Paper, East Lansing
South End, East Lansing

Minnesota
The Freeway, Duluth, Minnesota, 1971
Hundred Flowers, Minneapolis, 1970–1972
Minneapolis Flag, Minneapolis, 1969

Mississippi
Creem, Birmingham
Kudzu, Jackson, 1968–1972

Missouri
Daily Flash, St. Louis (changed name to Xanadu)
 The New Hard Times, (St. Louis, Missouri, 1968–1970
 The Outlaw, St. Louis, 1970–1973

Montana
Borrowed Times, Missoula, 1972–1980

Nebraska
Buffalo Chip, Omaha (started December 1967)
Omaha Kaleidoscope, Omaha

Nevada
Las Vegas Free Press, Las Vegas
Love, Reno

New Jersey
Abas, Newark, 1968–1969
All You Can Eat, New Brunswick, 1970–1973

New Mexico
Astral Projection, Albuquerque
Caliche County Rendering Works, Albuquerque, 1968–1970
The Fountain of Light, Taos, 1968–1970
The Hips Voice, Santa Fe

New York
Buffalo Insighter, Buffalo, 1967–1968
East Village Other, New York City, 1965–1972
Edge City, Syracuse, 1970–1971
New York Ace, New York City, 1971–1972
New York Avatar, New York City
New York Free Press, New York City
Other Scenes (dispatched from various locations around the world)
Rat Subterranean News, New York City, 1968–1970 (later Women's LibeRATion)
Space, Binghamton, New York 1972 (formerly Lost in Space)

North Carolina
The Anvil, Durham, 1967–1983
The Inquisition, Charlotte
Protean Radish, Chapel Hill

Ohio
Angry City Press, Cleveland, 1970
Aquarius, Dayton
The Big Us, Cleveland, 1968–1970 (changed name to Burning River News)
Columbus Free Press, Columbus, 1969–present
Cuyahoga Current, Cleveland, Ohio, 1972-
Great Swamp Erie Da Da Boom, Cleveland, 1970–1972
Hash, Warren, 1970–1972
Independent Eye, Cincinnati
New Age, Athens
Queen City Express, Cincinnati
Razzberry Radicle, Dayton
Minority Report, Dayton

Oklahoma
Home Cookin, Oklahoma City
Jones Family Grandchildren, Norman
Jones Family Grandchildren II, Stillwater
Osmosis, Tulsa, 1972

Oregon
Eugene Augur, Eugene, 1969–1972
Willamette Bridge, Portland, 1968–1971

Pennsylvania
Common Sense, Philadelphia, published by Philadelphia Resistance, 1969–1974
Distant Drummer, Philadelphia, 1970–1979 (changed name to The Drummer)
Philadelphia Free Press, Philadelphia, 1968–1972
Pittsburgh Fair Witness, Pittsburgh, 1970–1973 (changed name from Grok)
Plain Dealer, Philadelphia
Water Tunnel, State College
Yarrowstalks, Philadelphia

Rhode Island
Extra!, Providence

Tennessee
Root, Memphis, 1969

Texas
Dallas Notes, Dallas, 1967–1970 (originally Notes from the Underground)
The Eagle bone whistle, San Antonio
The Rag, Austin, 1966–1977
San Antonio Gazette, San Antonio, 1971–1975
Space City, Houston, 1969–1972 (originally Space City News)

Utah
Electric Newspaper, Salt Lake City, 1968 (at least 5 issues)
Utah Free Press, Salt Lake City, 1966–1969

Vermont
The first issue, Plainfield
Windham Free Press, Putney

Virginia
Alice: Blacksburg Free Press, Blacksburg
The Liberated Castle, Fort Belvoir, 1971
Richmond Chronicle, Richmond

Washington
Helix, Seattle, 1967–1970
Northwest Passage, Bellingham, 1969–1986
Sabot, Seattle, 1970–1971
Spokane Natural, Spokane, 1967–1970

West Virginia
Buffalo Chips, Huntington, WV
Liberator, Morgantown, 1969–1971? (later Mountain Liberator)

Wisconsin
Bugle-American, Milwaukee, 1970–1978
The Caravan, Milwaukee, 1967–1971
Connections, Madison, 1967–1969
Counterpoint, Stevens Point
Fox Valley Kaleidoscope, Oshkosh, 1970
Kaleidoscope, Milwaukee, 1967–1971
Madison Kaleidoscope, Madison
Mega Middle Myth, Beloit, 1968
Off the Pigs!, Madison, 1970's (affiliated with The People's Office)
The People's Dreadnaught, Beloit
What's Left, Milwaukee, 1970's

See also
Counterculture of the 1960s
GI Underground Press
Liberation News Service
Underground Press Syndicate

References

External links
 Underground/Alternative Newspapers History and Geography - maps and databases showing over 2,000 underground/alternative newspapers between 1965 and 1975 in the U.S.

 

Lists of newspapers